Taman is an Austronesian (Dayak) language of Borneo. Alongside Embaloh, it comprises the Tamanic branch of the South Sulawesi language family.

References

Languages of Indonesia
South Sulawesi languages